Mukunda Kakati (1919-1942) was an Indian revolutionary who participated Mahatma Gandhi's 'Ahimsa Andolon' and was shot dead by British Police in Gohpur Police Station for Quit India Movement on 20 September 1942.

Death and commemoration
The Fast Patrol Vessel Mukunda Kakati, is named after Kanaklata Barua. After Kanaklata Barua was shot, Mukunda Kakati raised Indian Flag in Gohpur police station, resulting another dead shot to Mukunda Kakati.

In Gohpur, there is a tank named Borpukhuri which was named for Mukunda Kakati and Kanaklata Baruah.

In 1994, the Assam State Government named Nalbari Civil Hospital as 'Swahid Mukunda Kakati Civil Hospital' honouring Mukunda Kakati's sacrifice.

References

1919 births
1942 deaths
Quit India Movement
People killed by law enforcement officers
People from Nalbari